Homer G. Tasker (February 19, 1899 – January 9, 1990) was an American sound engineer. He was nominated for two Academy Awards in the category Sound Recording.

Selected filmography
 Three Smart Girls (1936)
 One Hundred Men and a Girl (1937)

References

External links

1899 births
1990 deaths
American audio engineers
People from Grant County, South Dakota
20th-century American engineers